This is a list of places in Russia which have standing links to local communities in other countries known as "town twinning" (usually in Europe) or "sister cities" (usually in the rest of the world).

A
Aleksin

 Saky, Ukraine
 Salihorsk, Belarus
 Tivat, Montenegro
 Veľký Krtíš, Slovakia
 Yevpatoria, Ukraine

Arkhangelsk

 Ashdod, Israel
 Emden, Germany
 Jermuk, Armenia
 Oulu, Finland
 Portland, United States
 Sukhumi, Georgia
 Vardø, Norway

Apatity

 Alta, Norway
 Boden, Sweden
 Keminmaa, Finland

Armavir

 Armavir, Armenia
 Feodosia, Ukraine
 Gomel, Belarus

Astrakhan

 Brest, Belarus
 Grand-Popo, Benin
 Pembroke Pines, United States
 Rasht, Iran
 Sari, Iran
 Vitebsk, Belarus

Azov

 Aglandjia, Cyprus

 Bijeljina, Bosnia and Herzegovina
 Chillicothe, United States
 Courbevoie, France
 Feodosia, Ukraine
 Pylos-Nestor, Greece
 Sečanj, Serbia

B
Balakovo

 Cherepovets, Russia
 Trnava, Slovakia

Balashikha

 Martin, Slovakia
 Pernik, Bulgaria
 Yangzhou, China

Barnaul

 Baicheng, China
 Changji, China
 Flagstaff, United States
 Oskemen, Kazakhstan
 Shumen, Bulgaria

Belgorod

 Herne, Germany
 Niš, Serbia
 Pryluky, Ukraine
 Sevastopol, Ukraine
 Vyshhorod, Ukraine
 Yevpatoria, Ukraine

Birobidzhan

 Beaverton, United States
 Hegang, China
 Ma'alot-Tarshiha, Israel
 Niigata, Japan
 Nof HaGalil, Israel
 Yichun, China

Borisoglebsk
 Delmenhorst, Germany

Bryansk

 Comrat, Moldavia
 Dupnitsa, Bulgaria
 Gomel, Belarus
 Karlovo, Bulgaria

C
Cheboksary

 Afyonkarahisar, Turkey 
 Anqing, China
 Eger, Hungary
 Grodno, Belarus
 Rundu, Namibia
 Santa Clara, Cuba

Chelyabinsk

 Columbia, United States
 Nottinghamshire, England, United Kingdom

 Ürümqi, China

Cherepovets

 Aiud, Romania
 Balakovo, Russia
 Gorna Oryahovitsa, Bulgaria
 Liaoyuan, China
 Maladzyechna, Belarus
 Montclair, United States

Chernyakhovsk

 Kirchheimbolanden, Germany
 Palanga, Lithuania
 Salihorsk, Belarus

Chita

 Choibalsan, Mongolia
 Hailar (Hulunbuir), China
 Hulunbuir, China
 Manzhouli, China
 Ulan-Ude, Russia

D
Derbent

 Ganja, Azerbaijan
 Hadera, Israel
 Yakima, United States

Dimitrovgrad

 Dimitrovgrad, Bulgaria
 Guliston, Tajikistan
 Lida, Belarus

Dmitrov

 Flevoland, Netherlands
 Osimo, Italy

 Pitsunda, Georgia
 Puchavichy District, Belarus
 Rems-Murr (district), Germany
 Rēzekne, Latvia
 Rîbnița, Moldova
 Yahotyn Raion, Ukraine

Dzerzhinsk

 Bitterfeld-Wolfen, Germany

 Grodno, Belarus

E
Elista

 Aktau, Kazakhstan
 Khoni, Georgia
 Kyzyl, Russia
 Lhasa, China
 Ulaanbaatar, Mongolia
 Ulan-Ude, Russia

G
Gagarin

 Barysaw, Belarus
 Krupki, Belarus
 Orsha, Belarus
 Ratingen, Germany

Gatchina

 Ettlingen, Germany

Gatchinsky District

 Cēsis, Latvia
 Lichuan County, China
 Nyasvizh, Belarus

Gelendzhik

 Angoulême, France
 Ayia Napa, Cyprus
 Hildesheim, Germany
 Kallithea, Greece
 Netanya, Israel
 Vitebsk, Belarus

Guryevsk

 Chachersk, Belarus
 Jonkowo, Poland
 Nowe Miasto Lubawskie, Poland
 Olsztyn County, Poland
 Ostaszewo, Poland
 Shchuchyn, Belarus

I
Irkutsk

 Eugene, United States
 Gangneung, South Korea
 Haute-Savoie, France
 Kanazawa, Japan

 Pforzheim, Germany
 Pordenone Province, Italy
 Prijedor, Bosnia and Herzegovina
 Primorje-Gorski Kotar County, Croatia
 Shenyang, China
 Strömsund, Sweden
 Ulaanbaatar, Mongolia
 Vitebsk, Belarus

Istra

 Bad Orb, Germany
 Bečej, Serbia
 Dyurtyuli, Russia

 Loreto, Italy
 Petrich, Bulgaria
 Pinsk, Belarus

Ivanovo

 Ayia Napa, Cyprus

 Kraljevo, Serbia
 Mladenovac (Belgrade), Serbia
 Orsha, Belarus

Izhevsk

 Brest, Belarus
 Córdoba, Argentina
 Maracay, Venezuela
 Salt Lake City, United States
 Tatabánya, Hungary
 Wuhan, China
 Xining, China
 Yambol, Bulgaria

K
Kaliningrad

 Baranavichy, Belarus
 Bremerhaven, Germany
 Brest, Belarus
 Cagliari, Italy
 Catania, Italy
 Forlì, Italy
 Gomel, Belarus
 Groningen, Netherlands
 Kętrzyn County, Poland
 Kiel, Germany
 Norfolk, United States
 Zeitz, Germany

 
Kaluga

 Binzhou, China

 Minsk, Belarus
 Niš, Serbia
 Panorama, Greece
 Suhl, Germany
 Tiraspol, Moldova
 Yalta, Ukraine

Kandalaksha

 Kemijärvi, Finland
 Piteå, Sweden

Kansk
 Polotsk, Belarus

Kazan

 Ankara, Turkey
 Antalya, Turkey
 Astana, Kazakhstan
 Braunschweig, Germany
 Donetsk, Ukraine
 Eskişehir, Turkey
 Guangzhou, China
 Hangzhou, China
 Harare, Zimbabwe
 Istanbul, Turkey
 Monufia, Egypt
 Qalyubiyya, Egypt

 Tabriz, Iran
 Ulaanbaatar, Mongolia

Kemerovo
 Salgótarján, Hungary

Khabarovsk

 Bucheon, South Korea
 Harbin, China
 Niigata, Japan
 Portland, United States
 Sanya, China

Khimki
 Grodno, Belarus

Kineshma

 Baranavichy, Belarus
 Gudauta, Georgia

Kingisepp

 Jõhvi, Estonia
 Narvik, Norway
 Pitsunda, Georgia
 Raisio, Finland
 Renhuai, China
 Sassnitz, Germany
 Svietlahorsk, Belarus

Klin

 Byerazino, Belarus
 Krychaw, Belarus
 Lappeenranta, Finland
 Meishan, China
 Orly, France

Komsomolsk-on-Amur

 Jiamusi, China
 Kamo, Japan
 Weinan, China

Kostroma

 Aachen, Germany
 Babruysk, Belarus
 Bari, Italy
 Bat Yam, Israel
 Cetinje, Montenegro
 Ceadîr-Lunga, Moldavia
 Danilov, Russia
 Dole, France

 Durham, United States

 Ijevan, Armenia
 Ochamchira, Georgia
 Oral, Kazakhstan

 Samokov, Bulgaria
 Sanmenxia, China
 Soroca, Moldavia
 Vrbas, Serbia

Kotelniki

 Rahachow, Belarus
 Sokołów Podlaski, Poland
 Sudak, Ukraine

Kotlas

 Tarnów, Poland
 Waterville, United States

Krasnodar

 Burgas, Bulgaria
 Ferrara, Italy
 Harbin, China
 Karlsruhe, Germany
 Nancy, France
 Sukhumi, Georgia
 Tallahassee, United States
 Wels, Austria

Krasnogorsk

 Antibes, France
 Goirle, Netherlands
 Höchstadt an der Aisch, Germany
 Karelichy, Belarus

 Slivnitsa, Bulgaria
 Tukums, Latvia
 Wągrowiec, Poland

Krasnoyarsk

 Changchun, China
 Cremona, Italy
 Heihe, China
 Istaravshan, Tajikistan
 Manzhouli, China
 Oneonta, United States
 Samarkand, Uzbekistan
 Ulaanbaatar, Mongolia

Kronstadt

 Annapolis, United States
 Asipovichy, Belarus
 Changli County, China
 Dax, France
 Demre, Turkey
 Feodosia, Ukraine
 Ii, Finland
 Kotka, Finland
 Lushan, China
 Marostica, Italy
 Messina, Italy
 Mühlhausen, Germany
 Nafplio, Greece
 Narva-Jõesuu, Estonia
 Nordborg (Sønderborg), Denmark
 Oulu, Finland
 Oxelösund, Sweden

 Pinghu, China
 Põhja-Tallinn (Tallinn), Estonia
 Pudasjärvi, Finland
 Sumoto, Japan
 Toulon, France
 Zhongshan County, China

Kursk

 Bar, Montenegro
 Donetsk, Ukraine
 Feodosia, Ukraine
 Gomel, Belarus
 Niš, Serbia
 Novopolotsk, Belarus
 Polotsk, Belarus
 Primorsko, Bulgaria
 Speyer, Germany
 Sukhumi, Georgia
 Tiraspol, Moldova
 Užice, Serbia
 Witten, Germany

L
Lipetsk

 Anshan, China
 Cottbus, Germany
 Fabriano, Italy
 Vitebsk, Belarus

Lomonosov

 Anacortes, United States
 Framingham, United States
 Mariehamn, Åland Islands, Finland
 Oberursel, Germany

M
Magadan

 Anchorage, United States
 Baranavichy, Belarus

 Shuangyashan, China
 Tonghua, China
 Zlatitsa, Bulgaria

Magnitogorsk

 Atyrau, Kazakhstan
 Brandenburg an der Havel, Germany
 Gomel, Belarus
 Huai'an, China

Makhachkala

 Biskra, Algeria
 Hatten, Germany
 Ndola, Zambia
 Oldenburg, Germany
 Sfax, Tunisia
 Siping, China
 Yalova, Turkey

Maloyaroslavets

 Barysaw, Belarus
 Holíč, Slovakia

Michurinsk

 Munster, Germany
 Smolyan, Bulgaria

Mikhaylovsk

 Jurong, China
 Zhenjiang, China

Moscow

 Almaty, Kazakhstan
 Ankara, Turkey
 Astana, Kazakhstan
 Baku, Azerbaijan
 Bangkok, Thailand
 Beijing, China
 Berlin, Germany
 Bucharest, Romania
 Buenos Aires, Argentina

 Cusco, Peru
 Dubai, United Arab Emirates
 Düsseldorf, Germany
 Ganja, Azerbaijan
 Hanoi, Vietnam
 Ho Chi Minh City, Vietnam
 Jakarta, Indonesia 
 Ljubljana, Slovenia
 London, England, United Kingdom
 Manila, Philippines
 New Delhi, India
 La Paz, Bolivia
 Pyongyang, North Korea
 Rasht, Iran
 Reykjavík, Iceland
 Seoul, South Korea
 Tashkent, Uzbekistan
 Tehran, Iran
 Tokyo, Japan
 Ulaanbaatar, Mongolia

Mtsensk
 Kubrat, Bulgaria

Murmansk

 Alanya, Turkey
 Groningen, Netherlands
 Harbin, China
 Jacksonville, United States
 Minsk, Belarus
 Vadsø, Norway

Mytishchi

 Angarsk, Russia
 Bakhchysarai, Ukraine
 Baranovichi, Belarus
 Barysaw, Belarus
 Düren (district), Germany
 Gabrovo, Bulgaria
 Lecco, Italy
 Smalyavichy, Belarus
 Zhodzina, Belarus

N
Nakhodka

 Bellingham, United States
 Donghae, South Korea
 Jilin City, China
 Maizuru, Japan
 Oakland, United States
 Otaru, Japan
 Phuket, Thailand
 Tsuruga, Japan

Naro-Fominsk

 Babruysk, Belarus
 Daugavpils, Latvia
 Elin Pelin, Bulgaria

Nizhny Novgorod

 Bălți, Moldova
 Dobrich, Bulgaria
 Essen, Germany
 Győr, Hungary
 Hefei, China
 Heraklion, Greece
 Jinan, China

 Linz, Austria
 Matanzas, Cuba
 Minsk, Belarus
 Novi Sad, Serbia
 Philadelphia, United States
 Sant Boi de Llobregat, Spain
 Sukhumi, Georgia
 Suwon, South Korea

Nizhny Tagil

 Brest, Belarus
 Chattanooga, United States

 Novokuznetsk, Russia
 Yevpatoria, Ukraine

Novocherkassk

 Iserlohn, Germany
 Levski, Bulgaria
 Novi Bečej, Serbia
 La Valette-du-Var, France

Novorossiysk

 Brest, Belarus
 Constanţa, Romania
 Gainesville, United States
 Gavar, Armenia
 Gijón, Spain
 Heilbronn, Germany
 Livorno, Italy

 Pula, Croatia
 Samsun, Turkey
 Tomsk, Russia
 Tyre, Lebanon
 Valparaíso, Chile
 Varna, Bulgaria

Novosibirsk

 Daejeon, South Korea

 Mianyang, China
 Minneapolis, United States
 Minsk, Belarus
 Osh, Kyrgyzstan
 Saint Paul, United States
 Sapporo, Japan
 Sevastopol, Ukraine
 Shenyang, China
 Tiraspol, Moldova
 Ulaanbaatar, Mongolia
 Varna, Bulgaria
 Yerevan, Armenia

O
Obninsk

 Astravyets, Belarus
 Belene, Bulgaria
 Frascati, Italy

 Mianyang, China
 Montpellier, France
 Oak Ridge, United States

Odintsovo

 Kruševac, Serbia
 Novopolotsk, Belarus
 Wittmund, Germany

Omsk

 Antalya, Turkey
 Fuzhou, China
 Gomel, Belarus
 Kaifeng, China
 Manzhouli, China
 Pavlodar, Kazakhstan
 Petropavl, Kazakhstan
 Púchov, Slovakia
 Ürümqi, China

Orenburg

 Aktobe, Kazakhstan
 Khujand, Tajikistan
 Oral, Kazakhstan

Oryol

 Mary, Turkmenistan
 Offenbach am Main, Germany
 Razgrad, Bulgaria
 Zhodzina, Belarus

P
Penza

 Lanzhou, China
 Mogilev, Belarus
 Ramat Gan, Israel

Perm

 Agrigento, Italy
 Amnéville, France
 Duisburg, Germany
 Louisville, United States

 Qingdao, China

Petropavlovsk-Kamchatsky
 Kushiro, Japan

Petrozavodsk

 Brest, Belarus
 Duluth, United States
 Joensuu, Finland
 Narva, Estonia
 Neubrandenburg, Germany
 Rana, Norway
 La Rochelle, France
 Tübingen, Germany

 Vagharshapat, Armenia
 Varkaus, Finland

Podolsk

 Bălți, Moldova
 Barysaw, Belarus
 Hengyang, China
 Kavarna, Bulgaria
 Saint-Ouen-sur-Seine, France
 Shumen, Bulgaria
 Vanadzor, Armenia

Protvino

 Antony, France
 Bowling Green, United States
 Gomel, Belarus
 Lahoysk, Belarus
 Milan, United States
 Somero, Finland

Pskov

 Arles, France
 Daugavpils, Latvia
 Gera, Germany
 Neuss, Germany
 Nijmegen, Netherlands
 Rēzekne, Latvia
 Roanoke, United States
 Vitebsk, Belarus

Pushkin

 Bălți, Moldova
 Cambrai, France
 Kalamazoo, United States
 Mantua, Italy
 Nassau County, United States
 Neukölln (Berlin), Germany
 Novopolotsk, Belarus
 Semey, Kazakhstan
 Valence, France
 Veria, Greece
 Worcester, United States
 Zerbst, Germany

Pyatigorsk

 Dilijan, Armenia
 Dubuque, United States
 Hévíz, Hungary
 Kochi, India
 Panagyurishte, Bulgaria
 Schwerte, Germany
 Trikala, Greece

R
Rostov-on-Don

 Antalya, Turkey

 Dortmund, Germany
 Gera, Germany

 Kajaani, Finland
 Le Mans, France
 Minsk, Belarus

 Pleven, Bulgaria
 Seville, Spain
 Volos, Greece

 Yerevan, Armenia

Ryazan

 Alessandria, Italy
 Bressuire, France
 Brest, Belarus
 Genoa, Italy
 Lovech, Bulgaria
 Münster, Germany
 New Athos, Georgia

 Xuzhou, China

S
Saint Petersburg

 Alexandria, Egypt
 Almaty, Kazakhstan
 Antwerp, Belgium
 Aqaba, Jordan
 Astana, Kazakhstan
 Baku, Azerbaijan
 Bangkok, Thailand
 Barcelona, Spain
 Bethlehem, Palestine
 Bordeaux, France
 Busan, South Korea
 Cape Town, South Africa
 Colombo, Sri Lanka
 Constanța, Romania
 Daegu, South Korea
 Daugavpils, Latvia
 Debrecen, Hungary
 Dresden, Germany
 Dushanbe, Tajikistan
 Guadalajara, Mexico
 Haiphong, Vietnam
 Hamburg, Germany
 Havana, Cuba
 Le Havre, France
 Ho Chi Minh City, Vietnam
 Isfahan, Iran
 Istanbul, Turkey
 Khartoum, Sudan
 Klaksvík, Faroe Islands
 Košice, Slovakia
 Los Angeles, United States
 Mar del Plata, Argentina
 Maribor, Slovenia
 Milan, Italy
 Mumbai, India
 Nampo, North Korea
 Nice, France
 Osaka, Japan
 Osh, Kyrgyzstan
 Piraeus, Greece
 Plovdiv, Bulgaria
 Qingdao, China
 Rio de Janeiro, Brazil
 Rotterdam, Netherlands
 Santiago de Cuba, Cuba
 Sevastopol, Ukraine
 Shanghai, China
 St. Petersburg, United States
 Venice, Italy
 Westport, United States
 Zagreb, Croatia

Samara

 Feodosia, Ukraine
 Gomel, Belarus
 Krimml, Austria
 Oral, Kazakhstan
 Palermo, Italy
 Samarkand, Uzbekistan
 Spitak, Armenia
 Stara Zagora, Bulgaria
 Stuttgart, Germany
 St. Louis, United States
 Tongyeong, South Korea
 Zhengzhou, China

Saransk
 Botevgrad, Bulgaria

Saratov

 Dallas, United States
 Dobrich, Bulgaria
 Wuhan, China

Sergiyev Posad

 Cephalonia, Greece
 Fulda, Germany
 New Athos, Georgia
 Rueil-Malmaison, France
 Saldus, Latvia
 Slonim, Belarus
 Vagharshapat, Armenia

Serpukhov

 Balakliia Raion, Ukraine
 Bobigny, France
 Ceadîr-Lunga, Moldova
 Çeşme, Turkey
 Danilovgrad, Montenegro
 Forssa, Finland
 Pravets, Bulgaria
 Richmond, United States
 Sievierodonetsk, Ukraine
 Slutsk, Belarus
 Vratsa, Bulgaria
 Zaslawye, Belarus
 Zhanjiang, China

Severodvinsk
 Mazyr, Belarus

Shakhty

 Armavir, Armenia
 Gelsenkirchen, Germany
 Nikopol, Bulgaria
 Sievierodonetsk, Ukraine

Shchyolkovo

 Celje, Slovenia
 Feodosia, Ukraine
 Gagra, Georgia
 Grodno Region, Belarus
 Grodzisk Wielkopolski County, Poland
 Hemer, Germany
 Orhei District, Moldavia
 Rakoniewice, Poland
 Širvintos, Lithuania
 Talsi, Latvia

Smolensk

 Hagen, Germany
 Kerch, Ukraine
 Kragujevac, Serbia
 Targovishte, Bulgaria
 Tulle, France
 Vitebsk, Belarus

Sochi

 Baden-Baden, Germany
 Long Beach, United States
 Menton, France
 Nagato, Japan
 Rimini, Italy
 Trabzon, Turkey
 Weihai, China

Solnechnogorsk

 Krupki, Belarus
 Mali Iđoš, Serbia
 Smederevska Palanka, Serbia

Sosnovy Bor

 Alexandroupoli, Greece
 Astravyets, Belarus
 Kalajoki, Finland
 Pyhäjoki, Finland

Sovetsk

 Iława (rural gmina), Poland
 Kiel, Germany
 Lidzbark Warmiński, Poland
 Pagėgiai, Lithuania
 Považská Bystrica, Slovakia

 Tauragė, Lithuania

Spassky District

 Denpasar, Indonesia
 Safranbolu, Turkey

Stary Oskol

 Asenovgrad, Bulgaria
 Mänttä-Vilppula, Finland
 Salzgitter, Germany

Stavropol

 Béziers, France
 Changzhou, China
 Des Moines, United States
 Pazardzhik, Bulgaria
 Yerevan, Armenia
 Zhenjiang, China

Stupino

 N'Djamena, Chad
 Nahariya, Israel
 Pančevo, Serbia
 Telgte, Germany
 Velingrad, Bulgaria

Surgut

 Chaoyang, China
 Katerini, Greece
 Zalaegerszeg, Hungary

Suzdal

 Cles, Italy
 Évora, Portugal
 Loches, France
 Rothenburg ob der Tauber, Germany
 Shangrao, China
 Vyshhorod, Ukraine
 Windham, United States

Syktyvkar

 Cullera, Spain
 Debrecen, Hungary
 Los Altos, United States
 Lovech, Bulgaria
 Taiyuan, China

T
Taganrog

 Antratsyt, Ukraine
 Badenweiler, Germany
 Cherven Bryag, Bulgaria
 Jining, China
 Khartsyzk, Ukraine
 Lüdenscheid, Germany

Tikhvin

 Hérouville-Saint-Clair, France
 Imatra, Finland

Tolyatti

 Flint, United States
 Futian (Shenzhen), China
 Kazanlak, Bulgaria
 Luoyang, China
 Nagykanizsa, Hungary
 Piacenza, Italy
 Wolfsburg, Germany

Tomsk
 Ulsan, South Korea

Torzhok

 Melle, Germany
 Savonlinna, Finland
 Slonim, Belarus

Tula

 Albany, United States
 Barranquilla, Colombia
 Kerch, Ukraine
 Mogilev, Belarus
 Villingen-Schwenningen, Germany

Tver

 Bergamo, Italy
 Besançon, France
 Budyonnovsk, Russia
 Buffalo, United States
 Feodosia, Ukraine

 Kaposvár, Hungary

 Montemurlo, Italy
 Orsha, Belarus
 Osnabrück, Germany
 Veliko Tarnovo, Bulgaria
 Yingkou, China

Tyumen

 Brest, Belarus
 Celle, Germany
 Daqing, China
 Houston, United States

U
Ufa

 Ankara, Turkey
 Astana, Kazakhstan
 Bishkek, Kyrgyzstan
 Halle, Germany
 Hefei, China
 Minsk, Belarus
 Nanchang, China
 Qiqihar, China
 Shenyang, China

Uglich

 Idstein, Germany
 Keuruu, Finland

Ulan-Ude

 Anyang, South Korea
 Changchun, China
 Chita, Russia
 Darkhan, Mongolia
 Donetsk, Ukraine
 Elista, Russia
 Erdenet, Mongolia
 Erenhot, China
 Grozny, Russia
 Haeju, North Korea
 Hohhot, China
 Hulunbuir, China
 Lanzhou, China
 Manzhouli, China
 Rumoi, Japan
 Taipei, Taiwan
 Ulaanbaatar, Mongolia
 Ulanqab, China
 Yalta, Ukraine
 Yamagata, Japan
 Yeongwol, South Korea

Ulyanovsk

 Changsha, China
 Feodosia, Ukraine
 Gomel, Belarus
 Jincheng, China
 Krefeld, Germany
 Macon, United States
 Minsk, Belarus
 Oklahoma City, United States

 Wuhu, China
 Xiangtan, China

V
Veliky Novgorod

 Bielefeld, Germany
 Kohtla-Järve, Estonia 
 Moss, Norway
 Nanterre, France
 Rochester, United States
 Watford, England, United Kingdom
 Zibo, China

Verkhnyaya Pyshma
 Zhodzina, Belarus

Vladikavkaz

 Asheville, United States
 Vladivostok, Russia
 Yalta, Ukraine

Vladimir

 Anghiari, Italy
 Antalya, Turkey
 Babruysk, Belarus
 Baoji, China
 Bethlehem, Palestine
 Bloomington, United States
 Bukhara, Uzbekistan
 Campobasso, Italy
 Canterbury, England, United Kingdom
 Chongqing, China
 Erlangen, Germany
 Gagra, Georgia
 Haikou, China
 Kardzhali, Bulgaria
 Karlovo, Bulgaria
 Kerava, Finland
 Khujand, Tajikistan
 Leninsky (Minsk), Belarus
 Normal, United States
 Saintes, France
 Sarasota, United States
 Vawkavysk, Belarus

Vladivostok

 Akita, Japan
 Busan, South Korea
 Dalian, China
 Hakodate, Japan
 Harbin, China
 Ho Chi Minh City, Vietnam
 Incheon, South Korea
 Juneau, United States
 Kota Kinabalu, Malaysia
 Manta, Ecuador
 Niigata, Japan
 Pohang, South Korea
 San Diego, United States
 Tacoma, United States
 Vladikavkaz, Russia
 Wonsan, North Korea
 Yanbian, China

Volgodonsk

 Dolni Dabnik, Bulgaria
 Orsha, Belarus
 Tamási, Hungary

Volgograd

 Chemnitz, Germany
 Chengdu, China
 Chennai, India
 Cleveland, United States
 Cologne, Germany

 Dijon, France
 Hiroshima, Japan
 İzmir, Turkey
 Jilin City, China

 Kruševac, Serbia
 Liège, Belgium
 Olevano Romano, Italy
 Ortona, Italy

 Port Said, Egypt
 Ruse, Bulgaria

 Yerevan, Armenia

Vologda

 Burgas, Bulgaria
 Grodno, Belarus
 Kouvola, Finland
 Sevastopol, Ukraine
 Yevpatoria, Ukraine

Volokolamsk

 Chachersk, Belarus
 Dzyarzhynsk, Belarus
 Kapchagay, Kazakhstan
 Krāslava, Latvia
 Požarevac, Serbia
 Shopokov, Kyrgyzstan
 Sudak, Ukraine
 Tokmok, Kyrgyzstan
 Vasylkiv, Ukraine

Volzhsky

 Cleveland Heights, United States
 Collegno, Italy
 Lianyungang, China

 Shaker Heights, United States

Voronezh

 Chongqing, China
 Gomel, Belarus
 León, Spain
 Sliven, Bulgaria
 Wesermarsch (district), Germany

Y
Yakutsk

 Fairbanks, United States
 Harbin, China
 Heihe, China
 Murayama, Japan
 Olympia, Greece
 Velingrad, Bulgaria

Yaroslavl

 Burgas, Bulgaria
 Burlington, United States
 Dubnica nad Váhom, Slovakia

 Hanau, Germany
 Jyväskylä, Finland
 Kassel, Germany
 Nanjing, China
 Palermo, Italy
 Poitiers, France

Yekaterinburg

 Annaba, Algeria
 Ferentino, Italy
 Guangzhou, China
 Incheon, South Korea
 Managua, Nicaragua
 Plovdiv, Bulgaria
 San Jose, United States

Yelets
 Barysaw, Belarus

Yessentuki

 Elliniko-Argyroupoli, Greece
 Naftalan, Azerbaijan
 Saky, Ukraine
 Strelcha, Bulgaria
 Thrissur, India

Yoshkar-Ola

 Bourges, France
 Princeton, United States
 Szombathely, Hungary

Z
Zheleznogorsk

 Basarabeasca District, Moldova

 Spremberg, Germany
 Svishtov, Bulgaria
 Zhodzina, Belarus

Zhukovsky

 Le Bourget, France
 Fangchenggang, China
 Meerut, India
 Zhuhai, China

References

Russia
Russia
Russia geography-related lists
Foreign relations of Russia
Cities and towns in Russia
Populated places in Russia